Melbye is a surname. Notable people with the surname include: 

Anton Melbye (1818–1875), Danish painter and photographer
Fritz Melbye (1826–1869), Danish marine painter
Mads Melbye (born 1956), Danish epidemiologist
Terje Melbye Hansen (born 1948), Norwegian sport shooter
Vilhelm Melbye (1824–1882), Danish marine artist